The Royal Automobile Club of Victoria (RACV) is a motoring club and mutual organisation. It offers various services to members, including insurance and roadside assistance.

It has about 30,000 ordinary club members who have access to the lifestyle club properties and 2.1 million service members who hold any product offered by RACV.

It operates two clubs for members, in the Melbourne central business district and in Healesville. The City Club was redeveloped in 2005, the Healesville Country Club in 2009.

History
Automobile Club of Victoria was founded at a meeting held at the Port Phillip Club Hotel on 9 December 1903 called by Syd Day, Henry James and James G. Coleman. Henry James Joseph "Harry" Maddox (1862-1937) was elected as its first President, and H.B. "Harry" James, its first secretary. At that first meeting, a proposal from Henry Sutton, the Australian motoring pioneer, was unanimously adopted:
"that the objects of the club should be the promotion of a social organisation and club, composed mainly of persons owning self-propelled vehicles or motor cycles; to afford a means of recording the experiences of members and others using motor cars and motor cycles; to promote investigation in their development; to co-operate in securing rational legislation and the formation of proper rules and regulations governing the use of motor cars and motor cycles in cities, towns and country districts; to maintain the lawful rights and privileges and protect the interests of owners and users of all forms of self-propelled vehicles whenever and wherever such interests, rights and privileges are menaced; to promote and encourage the improvement, construction and maintenance of roads and highways and the development generally in this State of motoring, and to maintain a club to be devoted to the interests and advancement of automobilism."

It held its first car rally at Aspendale Racecourse in 1904. In 1916, the club received the approval of King George V to prefix the title "Royal" to its name.

It is an unlisted public company, limited by guarantee, and headed by a board of directors consisting of eleven independent non-executive directors and a managing director and CEO. The registered office is located in the Melbourne central business district. It was a founder of the insurance brand AAMI, previously known as Club Motor Insurance and now owned by Suncorp-Metway.

RoyalAuto magazine
RACV produces a magazine for its members, called RoyalAuto. It is published and distributed 11 times a year – monthly from February to November, and a combined December/January edition. The content is based on the three major topics: travel/touring and associated leisure content, motoring/mobility – mainly new and used car reviews and news, and news and programs which touch on broader mobility issues including road safety, public transport and the environment – and member benefits/news. As at March 2013, RoyalAuto had an audited circulation of 1.5 million, making it the largest-circulating publication in Victoria. It is the state's most-read monthly magazine.

RACV member magazine has been produced for more than 90 years. It began in 1922 as a monthly supplement in The Australian Motorist.  By the mid-1920s, it was launched as a stand-alone publication called The Royal Auto Journal.  In 1936, this changed to The Radiator, a newspaper-style journal. In 1953, the magazine became a colour publication called Royalauto, and now it is formally presented as RoyalAuto. In September 2012 a digital version, for iPad, was produced for the first time, and each digital edition is produced concurrently with the print magazine.  In August 2013, it was rated among the top 1% of magazine apps worldwide by app rating agency iMonitor. In November 2013, RoyalAuto was named Association or Member Organisation Magazine of the Year by Publishers Australia in its Excellence Awards 2013.

Subsidiaries and investments
 R.A.C.V. Finance – 100%
 Intelematics Australia – 100%
 Gippsland Solar - 100%
 Nationwide Group - 100%
 Insurance Manufacturers of Australia (IMA) – 30% (joint venture with Insurance Australia Group owning other 70%)
 Club Assist – 30%
 Australian Motoring Services (AMS)- 24% (joint venture with Australian automobile clubs)
 Collaborate Corp (Drive My Car) – 6.77% (P2P car sharing company)

References

External links
Royal Automobile Club of Victoria
RoyalAuto magazine
RACV makes an investment in Collaborate a peer-to-peer marketplace

Financial services companies established in 1903
Transport in Victoria (Australia)
Clubs and societies in Victoria (Australia)
Cooperatives in Australia
Insurance companies of Australia
1903 establishments in Australia
Automobile Club of Victoria, Royal
Automobile associations in Australia
Emergency road services